Dyscinetonyssus is a genus of mites in the family Laelapidae.

Species
 Dyscinetonyssus hystricosus Moss & Funk, 1965

References

Laelapidae